World Model United Nations is an MUN conference held every year in the month of July or August. It was founded on 30 July 2015. The first ever conference was held on 30 July 2015 in Air Force School Jodhpur. In that conference various notable Indian Air Force officers was invited including NK Tiwari as chief guest.

See also
Model United Nations
The Doon School Model United Nations
List of model United Nations conferences

References

Model United Nations
2015 establishments in Rajasthan
Recurring events established in 2015